Rhythm changes are a common 32-bar chord progression in jazz, originating as the chord progression for George Gershwin's "I Got Rhythm". The progression is in AABA form, with each A section based on repetitions of the ubiquitous I–vi–ii–V sequence (or variants such as iii–vi–ii–V), and the B section using a circle of fifths sequence based on III7–VI7–II7–V7, a progression which is sometimes given passing chords.

This pattern, "one of the most common vehicles for improvisation," forms the basis of countless (usually uptempo) jazz compositions and was popular with swing-era and bebop musicians. For example, it is the basis of Duke Ellington's "Cotton Tail" as well as Charlie Christian's "Seven Come Eleven," Dizzy Gillespie's "Salt Peanuts," and Thelonious Monk's "Rhythm-a-Ning". The earliest known use of rhythm changes was by Sidney Bechet in his September 15, 1932 recording of "Shag" with his "New Orleans Feetwarmers" group.

History
This progression's endurance in popularity is largely due to its extensive use by early bebop musicians. The chord changes began to be used in the 1930s, became common in the '40s and '50s, and are now ubiquitous. First, "I Got Rhythm" was by then already a popular jazz standard. Second, by listening to the song and writing a new melody over its chord changes, thereby creating a composition of a type known as a contrafact, a jazz musician could claim copyright to the new melody rather than acknowledge Gershwin's inspiration and pay royalties to Gershwin's estate. Third, using a stock, well-known progression for new melodies made it easier to perform a song at jam sessions, shows, and recordings because the bandleader could tell new musicians that the song uses rhythm changes and note any modifications and chord substitutions.

For contemporary musicians, mastery of the 12-bar blues and rhythm changes chord progressions are "critical elements for building a jazz repertoire".

Chords 
The rhythm changes is a 32-bar AABA form with each section consisting of eight bars, and four 8-bar sections. In roman numeral shorthand, the original chords used in the A section are:

{| class="wikitable" style="text-align:left; width:300px;"
|-
| width="25%" | I      vi
| width="25%" | ii      V
| width="25%" | I      vi
| width="25%" | ii      V
|-
|}

a 2-bar phrase, I−vi−ii−V (often modified to I–VI–ii–V), played twice, followed by a 4-bar phrase

{| class="wikitable" style="text-align:left; width:300px;"
|-
| width="25%" | I      I7
| width="25%" | IV     iv
| width="25%" | I      V
| width="25%" | I
|-
|}

In a jazz band, these chord changes are usually played in the key of B with various chord substitutions. Here is a typical form for the A section with various common substitutions, including VI7 in place of the minor vi chord; the addition of a ii–V progression (Fm7–B7) that briefly tonicizes the IV chord, E; and using iii in place of I for the final four bars of the A section:

The "bridge" consists of a series of dominant seventh chords (III7–VI7–II7–V7) that follow the circle of fourths (ragtime progression), sustained for two bars each, greatly slowing the harmonic rhythm as a contrast with the A sections.

The B section is followed by a final A section

Variant versions of changes are common due to the popularity of adding interest with chord substitutions, passing chords and changes of chord quality. Bebop players, for instance, would often superimpose series of ii–V (passing sequences of minor seventh and dominant seventh chords) or other substitutions for interest or in order to discourage less experienced musicians from "sitting in" on the bandstand. The opening I chord was often B6 in Gershwin's original, but beboppers changed it to BM7 or B7. For instance, the B section may appear as follows:

An even more adventurous bebop-style substitution is to convert C7 | C7 | F7 | F7 to Gm7 | C7 | Cm7 | F7, and then to further develop this substitution by changing this to Am7 D7 | Gm7 C7 | Dm7 G7 | Cm7 F7.

Examples

The following is a partial list of songs based on the rhythm changes:

"Anthropology" (Charlie Parker/Dizzy Gillespie)
"Cotton Tail" (Duke Ellington)
"Crazeology" (Benny Harris)
"Dexterity" (Charlie Parker)
"The Eternal Triangle" (Sonny Stitt)
"Fungiimama"  (Blue Mitchell)
"Gee" (solo section) (Gustavo Assis-Brasil)
"Lester Leaps In" (Lester Young)
"Moose the Mooche" (Charlie Parker)
"Oleo" (Sonny Rollins)
”Passport” (Charlie Parker)
”O Latido do cachorro” (David Feldman (musician))
"Rhythm-A-Ning" (Thelonious Monk)
"The Serpent's Tooth" (Miles Davis)
"Steeplechase" (Charlie Parker)
"Straighten Up and Fly Right" (Nat King Cole)
"The Theme" (Miles Davis)
"Tiptoe" (Thad Jones)

The component A and B sections of rhythm changes were also sometimes used for other tunes. For instance, Charlie Parker's "Scrapple from the Apple" and Juan Tizol's "Perdido" both use a different progression for the A section while using the rhythm changes bridge. "Scrapple from the Apple" uses the chord changes of "Honeysuckle Rose" for the A section but replaces the B section with III7–VI7–II7–V7.

Other tunes use the A section of "Rhythm" but have a different bridge. Tadd Dameron's "Good Bait" uses the A section of the Rhythm changes but a different progression for the bridge.

See also
Montgomery-Ward bridge

References

Further reading
R., Ken (2012). DOG EAR Tritone Substitution for Jazz Guitar, Amazon Digital Services, ASIN: B008FRWNIW

Chord progressions
Jazz standards
Jazz terminology